Express Train may refer to:
 Express train, a train making a limited number of stops
 Express trains in India, a type of trains in India
 Express Train, a model for the peopling of Polynesia by Austronesian peoples